Sweethearts of the Rodeo were an American country music duo composed of sisters Janis Oliver (guitar, vocals) and Kristine Arnold (née Oliver) (vocals). The duo recorded for Columbia Records between 1986 and 1991, releasing four albums and twelve singles for the label. During the 1990s, they also recorded two albums for Sugar Hill Records. The duo reached Top Ten on the Hot Country Songs chart seven times in the late 1980s, with their highest-charting singles being the No. 4 hits "Midnight Girl/Sunset Town" and "Chains of Gold", both in 1987.

Biography
Janis Oliver was born , and her sister Kristine Arnold was born , in the South Bay region of Los Angeles, California. They were raised in Manhattan Beach, California, and sang in elementary school, then performed bluegrass music as the Oliver Sisters during their teenage years.

The duo became Sweethearts of the Rodeo, taking the name from The Byrds' album Sweetheart of the Rodeo. After their discovery by Emmylou Harris, they secured slots as opening acts and backing vocalists for other artists. In 1977, the Sweethearts opened a Redondo Beach, California, show for Sundance, a group including 19-year-old Vince Gill. In 1980, Janis married Gill, by then a member of Pure Prairie League, Kristine married Leonard Arnold of the band Blue Steel. In 1983, the Gills moved to Nashville, Tennessee, followed by the Arnolds, with the sisters singing together again.

1986–1992: Columbia Records
In 1985, Sweethearts of the Rodeo won the Wrangler Country Showdown talent contest, then signed with Columbia Records. Sweethearts of the Rodeo's first single, "Hey Doll Baby", debuted in April 1986, followed by the release their self-titled debut album. Then came the duo's first Top Ten hit at No. 7, "Since I Found You". The song was written by Radney Foster and Bill Lloyd, and its success helped Foster & Lloyd secure a recording contract. Four more singles from the album followed, including the No. 4 hits "Midnight Girl/Sunset Town" and "Chains of Gold", their highest-charting singles.

A second album, One Time, One Night furnished three more Top Ten hits: "Satisfy You", "Blue to the Bone", and a cover of The Beatles' "I Feel Fine", but their next single, "If I Never See Midnight Again", peaked at No. 39. Two more albums for Columbia followed (1990's Buffalo Zone and 1992's Sisters), but neither produced any major hits. Columbia dropped the duo in 1992.

1993–present
Sweethearts of the Rodeo continued to tour in the 1990s, releasing two albums of bluegrass music on the Sugar Hill label: Rodeo Waltz in 1993 and Beautiful Lies in 1996. Janis and Kristine owned a clothing store in Franklin, Tennessee, called "Gill & Arnold" in the late 1990s, then closed it. Janis and Vince Gill were divorced in 1997. She married Roy Cummins in 2000; they divorced in 2010.

Discography

Albums

Singles

Music videos

References

Country music groups from California
Country music duos
Columbia Records artists
Sibling musical duos
Musicians from Manhattan Beach, California
Musical groups established in 1985
1985 establishments in California
Sugar Hill Records artists
American musical duos